Joe Wheater (6 October 1918 – 24 November 2011) was a British sport shooter who competed in the 1956 Summer Olympics, in the 1960 Summer Olympics, and in the 1964 Summer Olympics.

References

External links
 

1918 births
2000s deaths
British male sport shooters
Olympic shooters of Great Britain
Shooters at the 1956 Summer Olympics
Shooters at the 1960 Summer Olympics
Shooters at the 1964 Summer Olympics